Lion of Punjab is an Indian Punjabi action film starring Diljit Dosanjh, making his debut as an actor. It is also the debut Punjabi movie of Bollywood director Guddu Dhanoa. A huge set of a temple, a church, some houses and a shopping area, was erected at the Indian Express Office premises. It is a remake of 2003 Tamil movie Dhool.

The Punjabi remake of this film was released on 11 February 2011. with a music release on 31 January 2011.

The plot revolves around the lead character, Avtar Singh, who leads a fight against a power politician. The battle is a result of the politicians factory polluting the water of a local village, which leads to a rise in cancer cases for the inhabitants of the village.

Cast 
 Diljit Dosanjh as Avtar Singh
 Jividha Sharma as Jassi
 Pooja Tandon as Amrit
 Gurpreet Ghuggi as Amrit's Brother
 Deep Dhillon as Politician Balwant Rai
 Vivek Shauq as Balwant Rai's P.A.
 Vindu Dara Singh as Inspector Balbir Singh 
 Bhotu Shah as Tiwari
 Yaad Grewal as Babbar
 Rupinder Kaur 
 Malkit Meet
 Sukhmeet Sidhu as police inspector
 Parandeep Kainth

Music

The album was released on Speed Records in India and digitally around the world by Music Waves.

The lead track on the soundtrack is Lak Twenty Eight Kudi Da, a collaboration with producer Honey Singh, although the track itself does not feature in the film.

In the UK, Lak 28 Kudi Da (as it was re-titled for that market) reached the Number 1 position on the official Asian Download Chart on 30 April 2011. The track was released by Kamlee Records in the UK despite the soundtrack not being picked up for a physical release in that territory.

Track listing

References

2011 films
Punjabi remakes of Tamil films
Films scored by Anand Raj Anand
Punjabi-language Indian films
2010s Punjabi-language films
2011 directorial debut films
Films directed by Guddu Dhanoa